Pakistan Tobacco Company Limited is a Pakistani tobacco manufacturing company which is a subsidiary of British American Tobacco. It is headquartered in Islamabad, Pakistan and is the biggest cigarette maker in Pakistan. It has two factories which are located in Akora Khattak (which is near Nowshera), and Jhelum.

History
The company was incorporated in 1947 immediately after independence, when it took over the business of the Imperial Tobacco Company of British India which had been operational in the South Asia since 1905.

It has evolved from being just a single factory operation to a company which is involved in every aspect of cigarette production, from tobacco cultivation to packaging. Over one million people are economically dependent on the industry in Pakistan.

BPO hub 
Pakistan Tobacco Company will establish its Business Process Outsourcing (BPO) hub in Pakistan, which will serve the Asia Pacific and Middle East region. The hub will serve in parallel to the BPO hub in Malaysia. The company already had a BPO hub in Romania and Costa Rica.

Factories
The company operates two factories in following cities:
 Jhelum
 Akora Khattak, Nowshera

See also
 Tobacco industry in Pakistan

References

External links
 

1947 establishments in Pakistan
British American Tobacco
Manufacturing companies established in 1947
Companies listed on the Pakistan Stock Exchange
Economy of Jhelum
Tobacco companies of Pakistan
Pakistani subsidiaries of foreign companies
Companies based in Islamabad